Benjamin Afutu Kotey (born 2 May 1996) is a Ghanaian professional footballer who plays as a midfielder for Saudi Arabian side Al-Taqadom.

Career

Karela United 
Afutu played for Karela United when they played in the Ghana Division One League. During the 2017 season, he played 25 league matches, made 7 assists and scored 5 goals to help them win the Division One League Zone II and secure promotion into the Ghana Premier League.

Hearts of Oak 
Afutu joined Ghana Premier League side Accra Hearts of Oak in December 2017, after impressing the technical team during pre-season trials. He signed a three-year deal ahead of the 2018 season. On 29 April 2018, he came on in the an 80th-minute substitute for Joseph Esso to make his debut in a 1–0 rivalry match against Asante Kotoko. He only featured in 4 league matches in his debut season before the league was cancelled due to the Number 12 expose.

During the 2019 GFA Normalization Special Competition, he played 11 out of 14 league matches to help Hearts win their Group and progress to the semi-finals. However they lost to Asante Kotoko via a penalty shootout. He continued to play a key role in the team by playing 13 of the 15 league matches and scored 2 goals in the 2019–20 season as the league was again cancelled, this time due to the COVID-19 pandemic in Ghana.

In 2020, there were reports that he was refusing to extend his contract with the club hoping on getting a better contract renewal or signing for a new club. However, later signed a 1-year contract extension after negotiations with the club. Afutu was ever present in the club's historic 2020–21 domestic double success. He played 29 league matches, scored 5 goals from a defensive midfield position whilst winning man of the match awards against Elmina Sharks and Berekum Chelsea to help Hearts win their 21st league title after a 12-year trophy drought. He scored two goals on Heart's road to the 2021 Ghanaian FA Cup final. On 8 August, Afutu won the Ghanaian FA Cup following an 8–7 penalty shoot-out victory over Ashanti Gold at Accra Sports Stadium in the final, after a goalless draw in extra-time; Afutu played the full 90 minutes and in the shoot-out, he took Hearts' tenth penalty, which was saved by Kofi Mensah.

Honours 
Karela United

 Ghana Division One League Zone II: 2017

Hearts of Oak

 Ghana Premier League: 2020–21
Ghanaian FA Cup: 2021

References

External links 

Living people
1996 births
Ghanaian footballers
Association football midfielders
Karela United FC players
Accra Hearts of Oak S.C. players
Eastern Company SC players
Al-Taqadom FC players
Ghana Premier League players
Egyptian Second Division players
Saudi Second Division players
Ghanaian expatriate footballers
Expatriate footballers in Egypt
Expatriate footballers in Saudi Arabia
Ghanaian expatriate sportspeople in Egypt
Ghanaian expatriate sportspeople in Saudi Arabia